Baron Terrington, of Huddersfield in the County of York, is a title in the Peerage of the United Kingdom. It was created in 1918 for the former Liberal Member of Parliament for Huddersfield, Sir James Woodhouse, Kt. He was succeeded by his eldest son, the second Baron. His wife Vera Woodhouse, Lady Terrington, was one of the first female Members of Parliament. She represented Wycombe as a Liberal from 1923 to 1924. On the second Baron's death the titles passed to his younger brother, the third Baron. He notably served as a Deputy Speaker and Deputy Chairman of Committees in the House of Lords. His son, the fourth Baron, was also Deputy Chairman of Committees in the House of Lords. He had no sons and was succeeded by his younger brother, the fifth Baron. Known as Monty Woodhouse, he was a Conservative politician and an expert on Greek affairs.  the titles are held by his eldest son, the sixth Baron, who succeeded in 2001. He is a urologist.

Barons Terrington (1918)
James Thomas Woodhouse, 1st Baron Terrington (1852–1921)
Harold James Selborne Woodhouse, 2nd Baron Terrington (1877–1940)
Horace Marton Woodhouse, 3rd Baron Terrington (1887–1961)
(James Allen) David Woodhouse, 4th Baron Terrington (1915–1998)
(Christopher) Montague Woodhouse, 5th Baron Terrington (1917–2001)
Christopher Richard James Woodhouse, 6th Baron Terrington (born 1946)

The heir apparent is the present holder's son, the Hon. Jack Henry Lehmann Woodhouse (born 1978).

Male-line family tree

Arms

Notes

References

Kidd, Charles & Williamson, David (editors). Debrett's Peerage and Baronetage (1990 edition). New York: St Martin's Press, 1990, 

Baronies in the Peerage of the United Kingdom
Noble titles created in 1918
Noble titles created for UK MPs